Mark Mellman is a Democratic pollster and political consultant. He formed the group Democratic Majority for Israel in 2019.

Work
Mellman began work in politics during his Yale graduate studies. Mellman worked on Connecticut congressional candidate Bruce Morrison's 1981 campaign, which Morrison went on to win. Following this, Mellman formed a group called Information Associates in Washington, D.C., and the group was incorporated in 1986 as The Mellman Group.

Mellman's The Mellman Group had the Kerry presidential campaign as a client, a race Kerry ultimately lost. Speaking after the election, Mellman says he foresaw the outcome of the Swiftboat campaign against Kerry. As the campaign grew, with advertising and coverage heavy on right-wing media such as Fox News and the Drudge Report, Mellman says he observed an impact in the polls, a tide turning against Kerry. 

In January 2019 Mellman and other Democratic strategists started the group Democratic Majority for Israel, a group whose mission is to promote pro-Israel candidates among Democrats, especially in primary elections.

Mellman is a regular participant at AIPAC conferences, for example speaking at an AIPAC event in late 2019 in Columbus alongside Neil Newhouse and working directly for AIPAC in the past. In 2015 Mellman consulted for a $25 million advertising campaign for the AIPAC-funded group Nuclear Free Iran. Based on the premise that increased exposure to details of the deal would lead most Americans to oppose it, Mellman's campaign recommendations aimed to disrupt the Iran nuclear agreement by increasing public skepticism. Mellman's firm received a quarter million dollars for its work. Mellman has consulted for other Jewish and pro-Israel organizations as well.

As of 2016, Mellman was president of the American Association of Political Consultants.

Since Yair Lapid entered politics, Mellman acted as a senior strategist for him. He describes his relationship Lapid and Yesh Atid as differing from his other clients. He notes that this relationship goes back very far, with Mellman helping decide the name of the party.

Positions
In 2013, Mellman commented on increasing sympathy for Palestinian over Israelis among Democrats according to polling data. Mellman argued that this shift remained small, representing a minority of the Democratic base. However, Mellman suggested handling the issue while it remained minor. He said the best way to do so would be by appealing to specific communities through their own angles, such as LGBT issues, immigration, and health care access, while at the same time confronting the Israel issue head on. In late 2019, Mellman commented on a speech by Senator and Democratic Party presidential candidate Bernie Sanders to the liberal Jewish group J Street. Mellman opposed Sanders' suggestion that he would use the $3.8 billion in US aid to Israel as leverage to promote humanitarian policies in the Gaza strip. Mellman suggested that any aid cuts to Israel is not supported by the majority of Democrats and that the considerable support Sanders received for this position at the J Street event does not represent a majority of the Jewish community.

In 2010, Mellman suggested that Rasmussen Reports tended to be the most heavily stacked against Democratic candidates in elections.

Mellman opposed Sanders' run for president, supported Eliot Engel's run for a New York congressional seat against successful challenger Jamaal Bowman, and opposes Boycott, Divestment and Sanctions tactics against Israel.

Personal details 
Mellman is an active member of the Modern Orthodox synagogue Kesher Israel in Washington, D.C.

References

American Jews
American political consultants
Living people
Pollsters
Year of birth missing (living people)